Wheels is the second studio album by the American country music group Restless Heart. It was released by RCA Nashville in October 1986. "That Rock Won't Roll", "I'll Still Be Loving You" (#33 US Top 100), "New York (Hold Her Tight)", "Why Does It Have to Be (Wrong or Right)" and the title track were released as singles. The album reached #1 on the Top Country Albums chart and has been certified Gold by the RIAA.

Track listing

Personnel 

Restless Heart
 John Dittrich – drums, vocals
 Paul Gregg – bass, vocals
 Dave Innis – keyboards, vocals
 Greg Jennings – guitars, vocals
 Larry Stewart – acoustic guitar, lead vocals, string arrangements (9)

Additional Musicians
 Hollis Halford – Synclavier
 Mart Morse – Synclavier 
 Ray Christensen – cello (9)
 Gary Vanosdale – viola (9)
 George Binkley III – violin (9)
 Carl Gorodetzky – violin (9)
 Tim DuBois – string arrangements (9)
 Scott Hendricks – string arrangements (9)
 Alan Moore – string arrangements (9)

Production 
 Restless Heart – producers
 Tim DuBois – producer
 Scott Hendricks – producer, recording, mixing, mastering 
 Mark Behling – assistant engineer
 J. T. Cantwell – assistant engineer
 Chris Hammond – assistant engineer
 Daniel Johnston – assistant engineer
 Bill Whittington – assistant engineer
 Chuck Ainlay – mix assistant 
 Keith Odle – mix assistant 
 Carlos Grier – mastering 
 Denny Purcell – mastering
 Ted Jensen - Mastering Original CD pressing
 Bill Brunt – art direction, design 
 Greg Gorman – photography 
 Charles McCallen – photo tinting
 Mixed at The Castle (Franklin, Tennessee).
 Mastered at Georgetown Masters (Nashville, Tennessee).

Chart performance

References

1986 albums
Restless Heart albums
RCA Records albums
Albums produced by Scott Hendricks